Highway 306 is a highway in the Canadian province of Saskatchewan. It runs from Highway 6 to Highway 35.

Highway 306 passes near the communities of Estlin, Gray, Riceton, Bechard, Lewvan, and Colfax. Highway 306 intersects Highway 621 near Lewvan.

References

306